Mongolia participated in the 2010 Summer Youth Olympics in Singapore.

Medals 

 Otgonbayaryn Dölgöön won a silver medal as part of a mixed-NOC group. Thus the medal is not counted as won by Mongolia.

Athletics

Boys
Track and Road Events

Girls
Track and Road Events

Boxing

Boys

Gymnastics

Artistic Gymnastics

Boys

Girls

Judo

Individual

Team

Swimming

Triathlon

Girls

Mixed

Wrestling

Freestyle

References

External links

 Competitors List: Mongolia
 Mongolian NOC - Competitors List (in Mongolian)

2010 in Mongolian sport
Nations at the 2010 Summer Youth Olympics
Mongolia at the Youth Olympics